An iron meteorite fell on the Sikhote-Alin Mountains, in southeastern Russia, in 1947. Large iron meteorite falls have been witnessed and fragments recovered but never before, in recorded history, a fall of this magnitude. An estimated 23 tonnes of fragments survived the fiery passage through the atmosphere and reached the Earth.

Impact 

At around 10:30 AM on 12 February 1947, eyewitnesses in the Sikhote-Alin Mountains, Primorye, Soviet Union, observed a large bolide brighter than the sun that came out of the north and descended at an angle of about 41 degrees.

On November 20, 1957 the Soviet Union issued a stamp for the 10th anniversary of the Sikhote-Alin meteorite shower. It reproduces a painting by P. I. Medvedev, a Soviet artist who witnessed the fall: he was sitting in his window starting a sketch when the fireball appeared, so he immediately began drawing what he saw.

Orbit 
Because the meteor fell during daytime, it was observed by many eyewitnesses. Evaluation of this observational data allowed V. G. Fesenkov, then chairman of the meteorite committee of the USSR Academy of Science, to estimate the meteoroid's orbit before it encountered the Earth. This orbit was ellipse-shaped, with its point of greatest distance from the sun situated within the asteroid belt, similar to many other small bodies crossing the orbit of the Earth. Such an orbit was probably created by collisions within the asteroid belt.

Size 

Strewn field and craters 
Fragments of the meteorite were also driven into the surrounding trees, embedding themselves.

Composition and classification 

The Sikhote-Alin meteorite is classified as an iron meteorite belonging to the meteorite group IIAB and with a coarse octahedrite structure. It is composed of approximately 93% iron, 5.9% nickel, 0.42% cobalt, 0.46% phosphorus, and 0.28% sulfur, with trace amounts of germanium and iridium. Minerals present include taenite, plessite, troilite, chromite, kamacite, and schreibersite.

Specimens
Specimens of the Sikhote-Alin Meteorite are basically of two types:
 individual, thumbprinted or regmaglypted specimens, showing fusion crust and signs of atmospheric ablation
 shrapnel or fragmented specimens, sharp-edged pieces of torn metal showing evidence of violent fragmentation
The first type probably broke off the main object early in the descent. These pieces are characterized by regmaglypts (cavities resembling thumb prints) in the surface of each specimen. The second type are fragments which were either torn apart during the atmospheric explosions or blasted apart upon impact on the frozen ground. Most were probably the result of the explosion at  altitude.

A large specimen is on display in Moscow. Many other specimens are held by Russian Academy of Science and many smaller specimens exist in the collectors' market.

See also 
 Glossary of meteoritics
 Meteorite
 Meteorite fall
 Chelyabinsk Meteor
 List of meteor air bursts

References

External links 

 

Meteorites found in Russia
Primorsky Krai
Modern Earth impact events
Holocene impact craters
Geography of Russia
1947 in science
1947 in the Soviet Union
meteorite